Stenaelurillus modestus is  a species of jumping spider in the genus Stenaelurillus that lives in South Africa. It was first described in 2014 by Wanda Wesołowska. The species is a specialist that preys on Odontotermes termites, although its venom is also effective against other prey. It is genarally black in colour. The carapace has a border of white hairs and the abdomen is edged with bristles. It is distinguished from other members of the genus by the male's elongated palpal bulb and straight embolus, and the horseshoe-shaped depression in the female's epigyne.

Taxonomy
Stenaelurillus modestus was first described by Wanda Wesołowska in 2014. It is one of over 500 species identified by the Polish arachnologist. It was placed in the genus Stenaelurillus, which was first raised by Eugène Simon in 1885. The name relates to the genus name Aelurillus, which itself derives from the Greek word for cat, with the addition of a Greek stem meaning narrow. In 2017, it was grouped with nine other genera of jumping spiders under the name Aelurillines. It has been placed in the subtribe Aelurillina in the tribe Aelurillini in the clade Saltafresia. The species name is a Latin word that can be translated modest.

Description
The spider is medium-sized. It has a black oval carapace that is covered in dense dark hairs. It has a border of white hairs on the edge and two white streaks that stretch from eye field back. It has long bristles on its edge, The spinnerets are black and legs brown. The pedipalps are also brown. It can be distinguished from other members of the genus by its elongated palpal bulb, and straight embolus.

The female is very similar to the male in colouration and shape. The abdomen lacks the white patched that is found on the male. It is distinguishable from other species by the presence of a horseshoe-shaped depression in the epigyne.

The species is a specialist hunter and preys on termites in the genus Odontotermes. The spider captures its prey by a process of grasping and holding, injecting its capture with venom. Despite the spider being a specialist hunter, the venom is equally effective against other prey.

Distribution and habitat
The distribution is endemic to South Africa. The holotype was identified in the Ndumo Game Reserve in KwaZulu-Natal based on a specimen collected in 2012. It prefers areas of leaf litter in broadleaf woodlands.

References

Citations

Bibliography

Endemic fauna of South Africa
Salticidae
Spiders of South Africa
Spiders described in 2014
Taxa named by Wanda Wesołowska